Zlokukjani is a village in the municipality of Karpoš, North Macedonia.

Demographics
According to the 2002 census, the village had a total of 1635 inhabitants. Ethnic groups in the village include:

Macedonians 913
Romani 534
Albanians 46
Serbs 31
Turks 28
Bosniaks 9
Others 74

References

External links

Villages in Karpoš Municipality